Johnny Frank Garrett's Last Word is a 2016 American horror thriller film directed by Simon Rumley. It is a work of fiction based on the Jesse Quackenbush documentary The Last Word, about the trial, conviction, and execution of a Texas man, Johnny Frank Garrett. It played at the 2016 South by Southwest Midnighters, Festival Favorites, Shorts Programs and Special Events lineup

Plot
On Halloween night 1981, Catholic nun Tadea Benz is brutally murdered. In a rush to judgment, law enforcement in Amarillo, Texas feel pressured to solve the case quickly amidst widespread panic and lynch mob anger.  Soon a suspect emerges as 18-year-old Johnny Frank Garrett is arrested and put on trial.

Overlooking evidence that could have cleared his name, the jury passes swift judgment and Garrett is convicted and sentenced to death. From the time of his arrest until his dying breath Garrett professes his innocence, and following the execution a letter is found in his cell, promising retribution and cursing the souls of anyone connected with his demise.

Within weeks after his execution, Johnny's terrifying prophecy is unleashed as a series of unexplained deaths strike down those involved in the cover-up. As the list of victims grows, it is left to one conscience-stricken juror to exonerate Johnny and break his curse before it’s too late…

Cast
 Sean Patrick Flanery as District Attorney	Danny Hill
 Erin Cummings as Lara Redman
 Mike Doyle as Adam Redman
 Sue Rock as Harmony
 Jon Michael Davis as Doctor Andrews
 Cassie Shea Watson as Kathy Jones
 Mike Gassaway as Harold Pinkman
 Julia Lashae as Juror #3
 Holt Boggs as Impassioned Man
 Chip Joslin as Attendant
 Arthur Richardson as Chago
 Jon Arthur as Police Chief
 Bill Stinchcomb as Prison Guard
 Dodge Prince as Sam
 Tim Childress	as Execution Doctor
 Mister Brian as Corrupt Town Policeman
 Chris Dean Keith as pallbearer

Reception

Dennis Harvey of Variety wrote that overall the movie "juggles eerie restraint and grotesque frenzy with confidence."

John DeFore of The Hollywood Reporter wrote that Johnny Frank Garrett's Last Word was a "A schlocky fright flick where subtlety is a foreign language" and that it "may amuse hardcore genre fans but is unlikely to find takers for theatrical distribution."

References

External links
 
 

2016 films
American supernatural horror films
2010s English-language films
2010s American films